Scarface Mountain is a mountain summit located in the Adirondack Mountains, in the U.S. state of New York. It is located in the town of North Elba.

References

Mountains of New York (state)
Mountains of Essex County, New York
Mountains under 1000 metres